Endsville may refer to:

Endsville, an album by Huevos Rancheros
Endsville, a film by Steven Cantor, and starring Kyle Secor
Endsville, a poetry collection by Paul Durcan and Brian Lynch
Endsville, a fictional location in The Moon is a Harsh Mistress
Endsville, a fictional town in The Grim Adventures of Billy & Mandy
Endsville, a sculpture by Roland Brener